Raju Daniel (27 June 1950 – 17 September 2018), better known by his stage name Captain Raju, was an Indian actor and army officer. He acted in more than 600 films in various languages, including Malayalam, Hindi, Tamil, Telugu, Kannada, and English. He was best known for his performances in character roles, and as a villain. He also appeared in television serials and advertisements and has also directed two Malayalam films. The comic professional assassin character called Pavanayi played by Captain Raju appearing in the movie Nadodikkattu developed a cult status in Malayalam cinema.

Personal life

Raju was the third of the seven children of K. G. Daniel and Annamma, and was born at Omallur. He has four sisters named Elizabeth, Saji, Sophy, Sudha and two brothers, George and Mohan. Both his parents were teachers at Govt. UP School Omalloor. He had his primary education from Govt. UP School Omalloor and NSS English Medium School, Omalloor. He was a volleyball player. He pursued a degree in zoology from Catholicate College, Pathanamthitta. After graduation, Raju joined the Indian Army as a short-service commissioned officer at the age of 21 and was commissioned into the Regiment of Artillery and rose to the rank of a captain. Captain Raju is an alumnus of the prestigious Officers Training Academy, Chennai. He worked as marketing chief at glucose and starch manufacturing company, Lakshmi Starch, at Mumbai after serving 5 years of Indian army and later he left the job to act in films. While working at the company, he started acting in amateur drama troupes like Prathiba theatres in Mumbai. He later moved to films. He made his directorial debut with the Malayalam film Etha Oru Snehagatha in 1997. His second film as director was Mr. Pavanayi 99.99 (2012) in which he reprised the role of Mr. Pavanayi, his character from the 1987 Malayalam film Nadodikkattu.

He was married to Prameela, and had a son, Ravi. He was a Christian by birth, but also respected other religions, and even visited the others' shrines.
He was a native of Puthenpeedika, Pathanamthitta.
He was observed as very dynamic and vibrant during his childhood.
He was also an active member of St. George Orthodox Church, Palarivattom.
His parents' wish was to see him become a priest, about which he expressed at several places.
He was a staunch Orthodox believer and his contributions to the Church and the society are noteworthy.

Film career
Captain Raju first acted in an unreleased Hindi movie along with Tariq (Yaadon Ki Baraat fame) in 1980 as the supporting hero even before he made his break in Malayalam movies. Raju made his debut in Malayalam with the 1981 multi-starrer movie Raktham. The co-actor in the movie Madhu was greatly impressed with his performance. This made Madhu cast him as the hero in his first home production Rathilayam, which was a movie with A-listers of that era including Soman, Shanavas Rajkumar and Menaka. Captain Raju played the hero role in the movie with Silk Smitha as his heroine. Many B-grade films were made inspired by Rathilayam with Raju himself playing the lead in such low-budget masala films towards the late eighties.

But Captain Raju had established himself as a popular actor even before this phase. His first memorable role came out in the 1984 movie Athiratram, where he played a lead role along with Mamootty and Mohanlal. He also played some of the popular villain characters during this era. In the 1986 movie Aavanazhi, he played the villain role of Sathyaraj which was well appreciated. The grand success of this movie made him one of the busiest actors in Malayalam cinema. It was in the 1988 movie August 1 where Raju probably played the biggest villain role in his career. Raju's act as the unnamed killer determined to assassinate the Kerala Chief Minister was one of the high points of the film. It is considered one of the best villain characters in Malayalam cinema. In the movie Samryajyam, he played an antagonist gangster opposite to that of Mammootty. Khalid in Vyooham (1990) and Pathrose in Adwaitham (1992) were some of the other noted villain characters portrayed by him during the early 90s. His role as Aringodar of Oru Vadakkan Veeragatha was one of the characters which helped Captain Raju to change his track from villain characters (other being Pavanai). This movie helped him to reveal his true potential as a character actor. He also had a notable role in the 1988 movie Oru CBI Diary Kurippu. Captain Raju eventually stopped acting in villain roles during the early 90's. With the 1994 movie Kabooliwala , he became more selective and his role as Madassery Thampi in Puthukkottayile Puthumanavalan was a clear step towards this. He is also known for portraying the powerful elder brother role in the 1993 movie Uppukandam Brothers.

Raju is also known for playing some of the memorable comic characters. He became a household name in Malayalam cinema after his brief role as the comical assassin Pavanayi in Nadodikkattu. The character eventually attained a cult status in Kerala. The classic dialogue "Pavanayi Shavamayi” (Pavanayi is dead) along with the terms such as Malappuram Kathi, Ambum Villum, Transistor Bomb is still popular. His character as Karunan Chandakavala (Detective Karamchand) in the 2003 slapstick CID Moosa also got appreciated. Captain Raju reprised his iconic character Pavanayi in the movie Mr. Pavanayi 99.99. The movie's production was completed in 2012, but was released only a year after his death in 2019 due to some issues with producer. This was also his second movie as a director with the first being Oru Snehagadha released in 1997. Captain Raju's last movie was the 2017 Mammootty starrer Masterpiece, where he appeared as himself after a four-year break, as he was recovering from a road accident injury.

Death
A healthy, strong man during his youth, who gave increased importance to fitness, thanks to his military career, Raju's health was severely affected by a car accident, which occurred in October 2003 at Kuthiran near Thrissur. He was seriously injured, and was hospitalised for a long period. Though he survived, he lost the vision in his left eye, and also had problems with walking. Still he was active in films and public.

During his last days, Raju suffered from various ailments like diabetes and hypertension. He had a heart attack in 2015, for which he had treatment. He suffered a massive stroke during a plane journey to New York on 25 June 2018, and was admitted to a hospital in Muscat. He was brought back to Kochi for further treatment, and later left for his home. He died aged 68 in the morning of 17 September 2018 at his residence in Palarivattom, Kochi. He was buried with full state honours at Puthenpeedika St. Mary's Orthodox Church, Pathanamthitta on 21 September.

Filmography

As actor

English
Cotton Mary (1999) as Inspector Ramiji Raj

Kannada
 Jai Karnataka (1989)
 Nyayakkaagi Naanu (1989)

Telugu
Balidanam (1982)
Marana Sasanam (1987)
Shatruvu (1990)
Rowdy Alludu (1991)
Rowdy Inspector (1992)
Mondi Mogudu Penki Pellam (1992)
Kondapalli Raja (1993)
Tholi Muddhu (1993)
Police Lockup  (1993)
 Amma Koduku (1993)
Jailor Gaari Abbayi (1994) as Bapineedu
Gandeevam (1994)
Mondi Mogudu Penki Pellam (1994)
Maato Pettukoku (1995)
Pichchodi Chetilo Raayi (1999)

Tamil

Nalla Naal (1984)
Kadamai Kanniyam Kattupaadu (1987)
Jallikattu (1987)
Ullam Kavarntha Kalvan (1987)
Dharmathin Thalaivan (1988)
En Jeevan Paduthu (1988)
Soora Samhaaram (1988)
Sudhanthira Nattin Adimaigall (1988)
Dhayam Onnu (1988)
Jeeva (1988)
Chinnappadass (1989)
En Rathathin Rathame (1989)
Thaai Naadu (1989)
Naangal (1992)
Sevagan (1992)
Sivantha Malar (1992)
Ulle Veliye (1993)
Madurai Meenakshi  (1993)
Priyanka (1994)
Rajakumaran (1994)
Veluchami (1995)
Ninaithu Ninaithu Parthen (2007)
Ponnar Shankar (2011)

Hindi
 Kashmakash (2011)

Malayalam

 Raktham (1981)
 Thadakam (1982)
 Chilathivala (1982) as Aravindan
 Pooviriyum Pulari (1982)
 John Jaffer Janardhanan (1982) as Renji
  Coolie (1983) as Vikraman 
  Mortuary (1983) as Raju
 Iniyenkilum (1983) as Prasad
 Passport (1983)
 Nadi Muthal Nadi Vare (1983)
 Aana (1983) as Ranger Narendran
 Rathilayam (1983) as Appukuttan
 Asuran (1983)
 Coolie(1983) as Vikraman
 Ponthooval (1983)
 Changatham (1983) as Prem
 Athirathram (1984) as Rajesh
Theere Pratheekshikkathe (1984) as Mohan
Kadamattathachan (1984) as Neeli's lover
Kurishuyudham (1984) as Magician d'Souza/Lorence
 Sapadham (1984)
 Koodu Thedunna Parava (1984)
 Oru Sumagaliyude Kadha (1984) as SI Vijayan
 Minimol Vathikkanil (1984) as CID Inspector
 Thirakal (1984) as Chandran
 Pavam Krooran(1984) as Dasan
 Unni Vanna Divasam (1984)
 Shabadham (1984) as Prasad
 Premalekhanam (1985) as Babu
 Kiraatham (1985)
 Shantham Bheekaram (1985)
 Sammelanam(1985) as Basheer
 Aazhi (1985)
 Soundarya Pinakkam (1985)
 Ezhu Muthal Onpathu Vare (1985)
 Nayakan (1985) as Rahim
 Janakeeya Kodathi (1985) as Ayyappan
 Ee Sabdam Innathe Sabdam (1985) as Gopinathan
 Karimpin Poovinakkare (1985) as Pappan
Prathyekam Sradhikkukka (1986) as Shukkoor
 Hello My Dear: Wrong Number (1986) as Fernandez
 Nimishangal (Yamam) (1986) as Khalid
 Aavanazhi (1986) as Sathyaraj
 Kalathinte Shabdham (1987) as Devarajan
 Ivare Sookshikkuka (1987)
 Ithrayum Kaalam (1987)
 Ee noottandile Maharogam (1987)
 Oru Sindoorapottinte Ormakku (1987)
 Theekkattu (1987) as Basheer
 Yaagagni (1987)
 Naalkkavala (1987)
 Aattakadha (1987)
 Neeyallengil Njan (1987) as Balachandran
 Vrutham (1987) as Victor
 Nadodikkattu (1987) as Mr. Pavanayi
 Amritamgamaya (1987) as Suku
 Oru Sindoora Pottinte Ormaykku (1987) as C.K. Gupta
 Adimakal Udamakal (1987) as Sathyan
 Simon Peter Ninakku Vendi (1988) as Ramji
 Innaleyude Bakki (1988)
 Vadagagunda (1988)
 Chaaravalayam (1988) as Basheer
 Evidence (1988) as Damu
 Aranyakam (1988) as Police Officer
 Oru CBI Diary Kurippu (1988) as Dy SP Prabhakara Varma
 August 1(1988) as Nicholas
 Innale (1989) as Circle Inspector of Police
 Anagha (1989) as Nalini's Father
 Mudra (1989)
 Mahaaraajaavu (1989)
 Miss Pamela (1989)
 My Dear Rosy (1989)
 Agnipravesham (1989)
 Kali Kariyamayi: Crime Branch (1989) as Balachandran
 Aazhikkoru Muthu (1989)
 Oru Vadakkan Veeragatha (1989) as Aringodar
 Vyooham (1990) as Khalid
 Saandhram (1990) as Police Officer
 No.20 Madras Mail (1990)
 Nammude Naadu (1990) as SP Devarajan
 Enquiry (1990)
 Nale Ennundekil (1990) as Narendran
 Kadathanadan Ambadi (1990)
 Arhatha (1990) as Shekhu
 Appu (1990) as Suresh
 Samrajyam (1990) as Krishnadas
 Kalamorukkam (1991)
 Chakravarthi (1991) as Ashwani Prasad
 Neelagiri (1991)
 Kankettu (1991) as Peter Lal
 Ragam Anuragam (1991) as A K Menon
 Mahaan (1992)
 Kavacham (1992)
 Advaitham (1992) as Pathrose
 Rajashilpi (1992)
 Uppukandam Brothers (1993)
 Kabuliwala (1994) as Circus Owner
 Gentleman Security (1994) as Rajkumar
 Sankeerthanam (1994)
 Puthukkottayile Puthumanavalan (1995) as Madassery Thampi
 Special Squad (1995)
 Thakshashila (1995)
 Agni Devan (1995) as Pareeth
 Kalyana Sowgandhikam (1996) as Neelakantan Vaidyar
 Sankeerthanam Pole (1997)
 Itha Oru Snehagatha (1997)
 Sooryavanam (1998)
 Mattupetti Machan (1998) as Mattupetti Mahadevan
 Ilavamkodu Desam (1998) as Udayavarmman
 Daya (1998)
 Udayapuram Sulthan (1999) as Abdul Rahman
 Thachiledathu Chundan (1999) as Velupillai
 Pranaya Nilavu (1999) as Hajiyar
 Olymbian Antony Adam (1999)
 Stalin Sivadas (1999) as Narendran
 My Dear Karadi (1999)
 Captain (1999) as Ranger Jayadevan
 The Godman (1999)
 Ezhupunna Tharakan (1999) as Chacko Tharakan
 Aayiram Meni (1999) as Unnithan
 Snehapoorvam Anna (2000) as Father of Lover boy
 Valliettan (2000) as Ilias Mohammad
 Sraavu (2001) as Mohan Roy
 Red Indians (2001)
 Bhadra (2001)
 Rakshasa Rajav (2001) as DGP
 Sharja To Sharja (2001) as Kanaran Kappithan
 Puthooramputhri Unniyarcha(2002) as Kannappa Chekavar
 Swarna Medal (2002) as Ravi Varman
 Punyam (2002)
 Thandavam (2002) as DYSP Rajiv
 C.I.D. Moosa (2003) as Karunan Chanthakkavala
 Soudamini (2003)
 Pattalam (2003) as Colonel
 War & Love (2003) as Brigadier Nair
 Kottaram Vaidyan (2004)
 Wanted (2004) as Police Officer
 Sathyam (2004) as Police Officer
 Twinkle Twinkle Little Star (2005)
 Deepangal Sakshi (2005)
 Boyy Friennd (2005) as D. J. P.
 Vargam (2006) as Aboobakar Haji
 Kilukkam Kilukilukkam (2006) as Col. Panikkar
 Red Salute (2006)
 Ashwaroodan (2006) as Vishwanathan
 Thuruppu Gulan (2006)
 Aanachandam (2006)
 The Speed Track (2007) as College Principal
 Avan Chandiyude Makan (2007) as Vicar
 Black Cat (2007)
 Goal (2007)
 Nasrani (2007) as John
 Mayakazhcha(2008)
 Kovalam (2008)
 Twenty:20 (2008)
 Pazhassi Raja (2009) as Mancheriyil Unnimootha
 Sanmanasullavan Appukuttan (2009) 
 Happy Durbar (2010)
 Yakshiyum Njanum (2010)
 Arjunan Sakshi (2011) ... CM
 China Town (2011) as Vincent Gomez
 Theruvu Nakshatrangal (2012)
 Ezhamathe Varavu (2013) as Chief Archaeologist
 Abhiyum Njanum (2013) as Devanandan
 Mumbai Police (2013)
 Masala Republic (2014)
 Nikkah (2015)
 Aashamsakalode Anna (2015)
 Poyi Maranju Parayaathe (2016)
 Appuram Bengal Ippuram Thiruvithamkoor (2016)
 Masterpiece (2017) as As Himself & Pavanayi
 Stethoscope (2018)
 Mr. Pavanayi 99.99 (2019) as Mr. Pavanayi
 Valiyaperunnal (2019)
 Lessons (2020)

As director
 Mr. Pavanayi 99.99 (2019)
 Itha Oru Snehagatha'' (1997)

Television 
Serials
Nizhalukal (Asianet)
Crime Branch (Kairali TV)
Paliyathachan (Doordarshan)
Pandavapada (Doordarshan)
Vinodasala (Doordarshan)
Vikramadithyan (Asianet)
Alavudeenum albhuthavilakum (Asianet)
Dracula (Asianet)
Unniyarcha (Asianet)
Mahathmagandhi colony (Asianet)
Sreemahabhagavatham (Asianet)
Vallarpadathamma (Shalom)
Pakida Pakida Pambaram
Makal
Shows
Airtel Challenge as Quiz master (Jeevan TV)

References

External links
 
 Captain Raju at MSI
Video interview with Captain Raju

Male actors from Pathanamthitta
Military personnel from Kerala
Male actors in Malayalam cinema
People from Omallur
1950 births
2018 deaths
Indian Christians
People with diabetes
Male actors in Hindi cinema
Male actors in Tamil cinema
Male actors in Kannada cinema
20th-century Indian male actors
21st-century Indian male actors
Indian male film actors
Indian male television actors
Male actors in Hindi television
Male actors in Telugu cinema